Ajaccio station is a French railway station serving the town of Ajaccio, Corse-du-Sud department, southeastern France. It is served by trains towards Bastia and Mezzana.

See also
 Railway stations in Corsica

References

Railway stations in Corsica
Ajaccio
Buildings and structures in Corse-du-Sud
Railway stations in France opened in 1888